Scandalous: The Life and Trials of Aimee Semple McPherson is a musical with a book and lyrics by Kathie Lee Gifford and music by David Pomeranz and David Friedman. The musical has had productions in 2005 at the White Plains, New York Performing Arts Center, at the Signature Theatre in 2007, in 2011 at the 5th Avenue Theatre in Seattle and in 2012 on Broadway. The musical is based on the life of Aimee Semple McPherson.

Overview
The musical relates events in the life of early 20th century evangelist and pop culture icon Aimee Semple McPherson. It follows her life and career from her childhood to her controversial death in 1944, focusing on her mysterious kidnapping and the ensuing trial. Other highlights include her becoming the first woman to obtain a radio broadcast license in the United States, her cross-country drive unaccompanied by a man, her multimedia empire that included several newspapers, and her interactions with such contemporaries as Charles Chaplin and William Randolph Hearst.

Productions
Saving Aimee debuted at the White Plains Performing Arts Center in October 2005. The cast featured Carolee Carmello as Aimee and Florence Lacey.  A revised production, directed by Eric Schaeffer and choreographed by Christopher d'Amboise, opened on April 10, 2007 at the Signature Theatre in Arlington, Virginia for a limited run, with Carolee Carmello again in the title role.

Four years later, the musical played at the 5th Avenue Theatre in Seattle, Washington, from September 30 to October 29, 2011. It was directed by David Armstrong, artistic director at 5th Avenue, with choreography by Lorin Laterro, sets by Walt Spangler and costumes by Gregory A. Poplyk. Carmello again played Aimee, with Judy Kaye as Minnie Kennedy, Roz Ryan as Emma Jo Schaffer and Ed Dixon.

The musical premiered on Broadway at the Neil Simon Theatre, with previews starting on October 13, 2012, and opening officially on November 15, 2012. Carmello stars, with George Hearn playing both Aimee's father James Kennedy and a preacher Brother Bob.  Ed Watts plays Aimee's husband, and Roz Ryan is again Emma Jo. Direction and choreography are again by Armstrong and Latarro, sets and costumes are again by Spangler and Poplyk, and lighting is by Natasha Katz. The new title of the musical is Scandalous: The Life and Trials of Aimee Semple McPherson.  The producers include Foursquare Foundation and Dick DeVos, which The New York Times noted are "unusual newcomers", as Foursquare Foundation "provides grants to evangelical churches and ministries."

Scandalous closed on December 9, 2012 after 29 regular performances and 31 previews. Difficulties arising from Hurricane Sandy were cited as a contributing factor to the closing.

Carolee Carmello was nominated for a 2013 Tony Award in the category of Best Performance By An Actress In A Leading Role in A Musical and for a Drama Desk Award as Outstanding Actress in a Musical. The cast recording was released in 2013.

Musical Numbers
The musical numbers from the 2012 Broadway production are:

 Act I
 "Stand Up" – Aimee & Ensemble
 "Minnie's Prayer" – Minnie
 "Why Can't I?" – Aimee
 "He Will Be My Home" – Robert & Aimee
 "Come Whatever May" – Robert & Aimee
 "He Will Be My Home" (Reprise) – Robert, Aimee, James & Minnie
 "That Sweet Lass From Cork" – Ensemble
 "Come Whatever May" (Reprise) – Robert, Aimee & Ensemble
 "How Could You?" – Aimee
 "You Have a Fire" - Aimee & James
 "Minnie's Prayer" (Reprise) – Minnie
 "Follow Me" (Part 1) – Aimee & Ensemble
 "A Girl's Gotta Do What a Girl's Gotta Do" – Emma Jo & Girls
 "Follow Me" (Part 2) - Aimee & Ensemble
 "For Such a Time as This" - Aimee & Ensemble

 Act II
 "Hollywood Aimee" – Reporters
 "Adam and Eve" – Aimee, David & Eve
 "Foursquare March" – Aimee & Ensemble
 "Samson and Delilha" – Aimee, David & Ensemble
 "Hollywood Aimee" (Reprise) – Reports
 "Moses and Pharaoh" – Aimee, David, Emma Jo & Ensemble
 "It's Just You" – Kenneth & David
 "The Coconut Grove" - The Lovely Coconuts, Louella & Reports
 "No Other Choice" – Minnie
 "Hollywood Aimee" (Reprise) - Ensemble
 "Lost or Found?" - Aimee, Asa & Ensemble
 "What Does It Profit?" - Aimee
 "I Have a Fire" - Aimee & Ensemble

The musical numbers from the 2011 Seattle production are:

 Act I
 "Prelude" - Orchestra
 "Stand Up" – Aimee & Ensemble
 "For Such A Time As This" (Part 1) - Minnie
 "Why Can't I?" – Aimee
 "He Will Be My Home" – Robert & Aimee
 "He Will Be My Home" (Reprise) – Robert, Aimee, James & Minnie
 "Oh, the Power" - Robert, Aimee & Ensemble
 "That Sweet Lass From Cork" – Ensemble
 "Come Whatever May" – Robert, Aimee & Ensemble
 "You'll Be Safe Here With Me" - Mac (Harold Stewart McPherson) & Aimee
 "Follow Me" – Aimee & Ensemble
 "A Girl's Gotta Do What a Girl's Gotta Do" – Emma Jo & Girls
 "Follow Me" (Reprise) - Aimee & Ensemble
 "For Such a Time as This" (Part 2) - Aimee & Ensemble

 Act II
 "Hollywood Aimee" (Part 1) – Reporters
 "Adam and Eve" – Aimee, David & Eve
 "Foursquare March/Hollywood Aimee" (Part 2) – Aimee & Ensemble
 "Samson and Delilha" – Aimee, David & Ensemble
 "Hollywood Aimee" (Part 3) – Reports
 "Moses and Pharaoh" – Aimee, David, Emma Jo & Ensemble
 "Hollywood Aimee (Part 4) - Reporters
 "It's Just You" – Kenneth
 "This Time I'll Blame It On Love" – Aimee & David
 "Lost or Found?/The Trial" - Full Company
 "He'll Be My Home" (Reprise) - Aimee
 "Oh, the Power" (Reprise) - Aimee & Ensemble
 "I Have a Fire" - Aimee & Ensemble

The musical numbers from the 2007 Virginia production are:

 Act I
 "Stand Up" – Aimee & Ensemble
 "For Such a Time as This" - Minnie
 "Why Can't I?" – Aimee
 "He Will Be My Home" – Robert & Aimee
 "That Sweet Lass From Cork" – Ensemble
 "Come Whatever May" – Robert & Aimee
 "I Will Love You That Way" - Mac (Harold Stewart McPherson) & Aimee
 "Follow Me!" – Aimee & Ensemble
 "A Girl's Gotta Do What a Girl's Gotta Do" – Emma Jo & Girls
 "Why Can't I Just Be a Woman" - Aimee

 Act II
 "God Will Provide" - Emma Jo
 "Adam and Eve" – Aimee, David & Eve
 "Samson and Delilha" – Aimee, David & Ensemble
 "Let My People Go!" – Aimee, David, Emma Jo & Ensemble
 "Saving Aimee" – Minnie
 "The Silent, Sorrowful Shadows" - Aimee
 "Demon in a Dress" - Brother Bob
 "Emma Jo's Lament" - Emma Jo
 "Lost or Found?" - Aimee, Asa & Ensemble
 "Paying The Price" - Aimee
 "I Had Fire" - Aimee & Ensemble

Songs cut from earlier versions of the production:
 "The Silent, Sorrowful Shadows" - Aimee
 "God Will Provide" - Emma Jo
 "Emma Jo's Lament" - Emma Jo
 "A Letter From Home" - James
 "Demon in a Dress" - Brother Bob
 "Saving Aimee" - Minnie

Critical reception
In its review of the Signature Theatre production, Variety wrote: "All is contained in Gifford's exceedingly thorough book, ripping nonstop from one crisis to another under Schaeffer's free-flowing direction. Pomeranz and Friedman break up the action with an enjoyable blend of tunes that opens with the spirited "Stand Up!"; highlights include an Irish jig, a rousing spiritual, some big ensemble numbers, and Aimee's signature tune, "Why Can't I Just Be a Woman?" " The theatremania reviewer of the same production wrote that the musical is a "rousing experience, thanks to a group of tour-de-force performances, especially from ... Carmello in the title role, and songs ... that add layers of emotional shading missing from the dialogue played out between them. Director Eric Schaeffer's deft hand maximizes the show's strengths, fusing performers, songs, and story into an entertaining blend."

See also
Aimee Semple McPherson

References

External links
'Scandalous' at IBDB
Broadwayworld.com review

2005 musicals
Broadway musicals
Aimee Semple McPherson